Opetiops is a genus of timber flies (family Pantophthalmidae) containing a single described species, Opetiops alienus, occurring in Colombia, Peru, Brazil, and Paraguay. It is the only member of the family Pantophthalmidae that is not in the genus Pantophthalmus.

References

Monotypic Brachycera genera
Stratiomyoidea
Insects described in 1916
Taxa named by Günther Enderlein
Diptera of South America